Woo is an uncommon Korean surname.

Clans
Woo may be written with either of two hanja. Each has one bon-gwan: for the former, Danyang, Chungcheongbuk-do, and for the latter, Mokcheon-eup (목천읍), Dongnam-gu, Cheonan, Chungcheongnam-do, both in what is today South Korea. The 2000 South Korean census found 180,141 people with these family names. In a study by the National Institute of the Korean Language based on 2007 application data for South Korean passports, it was found that 97.0% of people with this surname spelled it in Latin letters as Woo in their passports, while only 1.6% spelled it as Wu. Rarer alternative spellings (the remaining 1.4%) included U and Wo.

People with the surname

U Tak (1262-1342), Korean Confucian scholar during the Goryeo dynasty
Woo Jang-choon (1898–1959), Korean-born Japanese botanist
Woo Yong-gak (1929–2012), North Korean commando held in South Korea as one of the unconverted long-term prisoners
Kyu Sung Woo (born 1941), South Korean architect
U Tong-chuk (born 1942), North Korean politician
Woo In-hee (died 1981), North Korean actress and mistress of Kim Jong-il
Woo Bum-kon (1955–1982), South Korean police officer and spree killer
Meredith Jung-En Woo (born 1958), South Korean-born American political scientist
Woo Hee-young (born 1963), South Korean footballer
Sung J. Woo (born 1971), South Korean-born American writer
Hyo-Won Woo (born 1974), South Korean composer
Woo Sung-yong (born 1974), South Korean footballer
Woo Chul (born 1978), South Korean swimmer
Woo Sun-hee (born 1978), South Korean handball player
Masta Wu (born Woo Jin-won, 1978), South Korean rapper
Woo Seung-je (born 1982), South Korean footballer
Woo Seung-yeon (1983–2009), South Korean actress
Woo Jin-yong (born 1986), CrossFit and snowboard athlete
Woo Seung-jae (born 1986), South Korean wrestler
Kevin Woo (born 1991), American singer of Korean descent
Woo Do-hwan (born 1992), South Korean actor
Woo Hye-lim (born 1992), South Korean singer and member of girl group Wonder Girls
Zico (rapper) (born Woo Ji-ho, 1992), South Korean rapper, member of boy group Block B
Woo Joo-sung (born 1993), South Korean footballer
Woo Won-jae (born 1996), South Korean rapper
Woo Jin-young (born 1997), South Korean singer and rapper
Woo Ha-ram (born 1998), South Korean diver

See also
 Danyang Woo clan
List of Korean family names

References

Korean-language surnames